Gee Hill [el. ]  is a summit in Hickman County, Tennessee, in the United States. 

Gee Hill was named for a pioneer named Gee, who settled there.

References

Landforms of Hickman County, Tennessee
Mountains of Tennessee